

Cellular and molecular neuroscience